Trichophagia is the compulsive eating of hair associated with trichotillomania (hair pulling). In trichophagia, people with trichotillomania also ingest the hair that they pull; in extreme cases this can lead to a hair ball (trichobezoar). The term is derived from ancient Greek θρίξ,  ("hair") and φαγεῖν,  ("to eat").

Signs and symptoms
Trichophagia is characterized by the person eating hair, usually their own; primarily after pulling it out. Most often, hair is pulled out and then the ends of the root bulb are eaten, or occasionally the hair shaft itself. The hair eventually collects in the gastrointestinal tract (on occasion, and depending upon severity of symptoms) causing indigestion and stomach pain.  Ritual is a strong factor, and may involve touching the root bulb to the lips, tasting the hair, and occasionally chewing it. Sometimes those with the disorder may even eat the hair of others. In the psychiatric field it is considered a compulsive psychological disorder.

Prognosis
Rapunzel syndrome, an extreme form of trichobezoar in which the "tail" of the hair ball extends into the intestines, and can be fatal if misdiagnosed. In some cases, surgery may be required to remove the mass; a trichobezoar weighing  was removed from the stomach of an 18-year-old woman with trichophagia.

History
Trichophagia is most often covered in the medical literature only "as a rare symptom of trichotillomania." In the 18th century French doctor M. Baudamant described the condition in a 16-year-old boy.

In media
Trichophagia is mentioned in the 1000 Ways to Die episode "Stupid Is As Stupid Dies" featuring a young woman who died from it. It is also mentioned in Grey's Anatomy season 9 episode 11 "The End Is the Beginning Is the End". As well as Season 3 episode 16 of The Resident, “Reverse Cinderella.”

References

External links 

The TLC Foundation for Body-Focused Repetitive Behaviors

Body-focused repetitive behavior
Eating behaviors
Habit and impulse disorders
Hair diseases
Hair removal
Human hair
Pica (disorder)